Rostock Thierfelder Straße station is a railway station in the town of Rostock, Mecklenburg-Vorpommern, Germany.

Trivia
Rostock Thierfelder Straße station is written in all documents by Deutsche Bahn in this form, although the corresponding street was named after a person (Theodor Thierfelder) whose street is called therefore Thierfelderstraße.

References

Thierfelder
Railway stations in Germany opened in 2000